The Macedonian calendar is the calendar traditionally used in North Macedonia. It has names for all twelve months in the year, which are accepted in the country and are called using standard international name forms which stem from Latin names of the months, have their own Macedonian names which in the current language are considered archaic and are most commonly used in official matters and documents (for instance religious calendars) of the Macedonian Orthodox Church as well as in some rural regions in North Macedonia. The origin of the Macedonian names of months is closely related to natural changes of weather and agriculture which happen during the period of the month. Some months also have several terms used in different regions of the country. Today's modern names of the months were first being used towards the end of the 19th century, most commonly with the suffix -ја as for instance in words such as јануарија (januarja), февруарија (fevruarija), септемврија (septemvrija), декемврија (dekemvrija) etc. Their full acceptance and use in everyday speech came into effect with the process of mass education of school pupils.

Macedonian names of the months

Common month names in different regions of North Macedonia
In Gevgelija, S. Tanovikj noted common month names which are displayed in the aforementioned table and there is a difference in the names for May - crešar, June - žitvar, July - biljar, August - prabraždenski, September - bugurojčin (or gruzdober), October - mitrovski or kasim, November - listupad and December - gulemijut mesic or bužikjov.

Common names of the months in the village of Valandovo Pirava are the following: koložeg - January, sečko - February, letnik - March, treven - April, cutnik - May, crvenik - June, gorešnik - July, gumnar - August, grozdober - September, listokap - October, snežen - November, student - December.

In the region of Bošavija, in the foot of the mountain Kožuf in Kavadarci there are different names and explanations for the names of months. For the month of November, the name alistopo was used, for December andreja and people believed that it was the period of the start of winter and Andreja was a person who was throwing snowflakes. For the month of January, the name koložeg was used with the explanation that it was the worst winter month and that "regardless of where you are, you should be at home in January. You should possess a car with wood and flour". It is also noted through a legent that the name of the month koložeg came from the cold weather in that month which caused people not to have means of heat, so they were forced to burn their wooden carriages.

In the Macedonian ethnic region Golo Brdo in Albania, the following names and forms are used for certain months: koložek or kolodžek for January, čerešnar or crešnar for June, žetvar for July, dorvar or drvar for November and jodre for December.

Common counting of the duration of months
According to research performed by ethnologists and anthropologists, the duration of months of the culture of Macedonians was usually counted and determined according to certain holidays and festivities, called medžnici or sinori. Those are the big Christian holidays that exist in each month of the year. The duration of months among common Macedonian people looked like this:
јануари - from Vrtolom to Vasilica
коложег - from Vasilica to Saint Tryphon
сечко - from Saint Tryphon to Letnik
марта - from Letnik to Blagovec
април - from Blagovec to Eremija
мај - from Eremija (Gjurgjovden) to Duhovden.
јуни - from Duhovden to Ivanden
јули - from Ilinden to Golema Bogorodica
август - from Golema Bogorodica to Krstovden
септември - from Krstovden to Petkovden
октомври - from Petkovden to Mitrovden
ноември - from Mitrovden to Prečista
декември - from Prečista to Saint Ana or Saint Ignat.

This calendar indicates a year consisting of 13 months which is equivalent with the number of monthly changes in the duration of a year. This in turn demonstrates that people from the past determined months and oriented themselves according to the number of changes of the moon in a year.

See also
 Slavic calendar
 Julian calendar

References
 

Calendars
Months
Macedonian culture
Macedonian language